Han Zhenxiang (born 1930) is a Chinese electrical engineer. He served as President of Zhejiang University and of the Chinese Society for Electrical Engineering. He is an academician of the Chinese Academy of Sciences.

Biography
Han was born in 1930 in Hangzhou, and his hometown is Xiaoshan of Zhejiang Province. Han obtained BEng from the Department of Electrical Engineering of Zhejiang University in Hangzhou in 1951. Han further studied in Moscow, USSR, and obtained his doctorate (Russian: Кандидат наук) from the Moscow Power Engineering Institute in 1961.

Han was a professor of electrical engineering at Zhejiang University. From February 1984 to February 1988, Han was the President of Zhejiang University. Han was elected Academician of the Chinese Academy of Sciences in 1999.

Han was the 3rd and 4th President of the Chinese Society for Electrical Engineering (CSEE). He currently is an honorary member of the society.

Work
Han is a key pioneer of the large-scaled electrical networks in China. Han mainly worked on the fault diagnosis of power systems, the control and stability of electrical power systems, and the optimal design of electrical power networks.

Han is also one of the first in China to combine computer artificial intelligence with electrical power networks, and developed several computer softwares which were widely used in China for controlling and estimating electrical power systems.

References

External links
 China Vitae : Biography of Han Zhenxiang
 Hangzhou Sci & Tech: the profile of Han Zhenxiang
 Hudong.com Encyclopedia: introduction of Han Zhenxiang
 Chinese Society for Electrical Engineering homepage 

 

1930 births
Living people
Chinese electrical engineers
Educators from Hangzhou
Engineers from Zhejiang
Members of the Chinese Academy of Sciences
Moscow Power Engineering Institute alumni
Presidents of Zhejiang University
Zhejiang University alumni